Liolaemus igneus, the Puna reddish lizard, is a species of lizard in the family  Liolaemidae. It is native to Chile.

References

igneus
Reptiles described in 2016
Reptiles of Chile